Anhayla Rene Stanley (born May 24, 1988), better known by her stage name Anhayla, is an American singer, songwriter, and guitarist. She is known for covering popular R&B and hip hop songs presented on her YouTube channel, Anhaylarene. Anhayla was endorsed by Crafter guitars in 2013.

Early life

Anhayla was born in Norfolk, Virginia, and began singing at the age of 5. She started writing music on the piano in middle school and credits her mother as a being a musical influence. Anhayla attended Virginia Commonwealth University and studied accounting.

Career

In 2010, Anhayla participated in We Are the World 25 for Haiti (YouTube edition). In 2013, she released an album If I Was.

Anhayla made her first national appearance in a 2015 AT&T commercial, singing Spaceship.

In a 2016 interview with NPR, Anhayla revealed that she has more than twenty inches of scars on her back as a result of a car accident. Her struggle with self-image lead her to organize Girls Nite Out, an annual event that encourages positivity and self-esteem for girls ages 5 to 18.

Discography

Albums

Singles

See also
 YouTube personalities

References

External links 
 
 

1988 births
Living people
African-American women singer-songwriters
American hip hop singers
American soul singers
American contemporary R&B singers
Musicians from Norfolk, Virginia
Singer-songwriters from Virginia
21st-century American women singers
21st-century American singers
21st-century African-American women singers
20th-century African-American people
20th-century African-American women